Tactusa is a genus of moths of the family Erebidae. The genus was erected by Michael Fibiger in 2010.

Species
The sumatrensis species group
Tactusa major Fibiger, 2010
Tactusa rima Fibiger, 2010
Tactusa sine Fibiger, 2010
Tactusa sumatrensis Fibiger, 2010
Tactusa parasumatrensis Fibiger, 2010
The trigonifera species group
Tactusa schnacki Fibiger, 2010
Tactusa trigonifera (Hampson, 1898)
Tactusa nilssoni Fibiger, 2010
Tactusa ostium Fibiger, 2010
Tactusa peregovitsi Fibiger, 2010
Tactusa flavoniger Fibiger, 2010
The nieukerkeni species group
Tactusa nieukerkeni Fibiger, 2010
Tactusa topi Fibiger, 2010
Tactusa incognita Fibiger, 2010
Tactusa tranumi Fibiger, 2010
Tactusa bechi Fibiger, 2010
Tactusa dohertyi Fibiger, 2010
The artus species group
Tactusa minor Fibiger, 2010
Tactusa jeppeseni Fibiger, 2010
Tactusa artus Fibiger, 2010
Tactusa biartus Fibiger, 2010
Tactusa similis Fibiger, 2010
Tactusa constrictor Fibiger, 2010
Tactusa assamiensis Fibiger, 2010
Tactusa discrepans Fibiger, 2010
Tactusa spadix Fibiger, 2010
Tactusa pars Fibiger, 2010
Tactusa flexus Fibiger, 2011
The virga species group
Tactusa virga Fibiger, 2011
The brevis species group
Tactusa brevis Fibiger, 2011

References

Micronoctuini
Noctuoidea genera